Hatfield is a middle income residential suburb in the south of Harare, Zimbabwe. The suburb was laid out in 1920.

History
Hatfield was named after the ancestral home of the Marquess of Salisbury. It was first settled on by Robert Snodgrass and David Mitchell, two transport riders who made a fortune selling whisky to newly arrived settlers in 1891. The partnership broke up shortly after another property, a subdivision of the farm, near today's Willowvale, which was given the name of Ardbennie, had been acquired.

William Edward Webb was granted title the nearby area of Prospect in 1894, which later became a residential subdivision, although little is known of his activities. Hatfield takes its name from Hatfield, Hertfordshire.

Notable people 
The following people have resided in Hatfield:
 William Harper, Rhodesian politician
 Acie Lumumba
 Lance Smith, Rhodesian politician

See also
 Waterfalls, Harare

References

Suburbs of Harare